12 teams took part in the league with FC Spartak Moscow winning the championship.

League standings

Results

Top scorer
19 goals
 Anatoli Ilyin (Spartak Moscow)

14 goals
 Valentin Ivanov (Torpedo Moscow)

13 goals
 Gennadi Gusarov (Torpedo Moscow)

11 goals
 Valeri Urin (Dynamo Moscow)

10 goals
 German Apukhtin (CSK MO Moscow)
 Adamas Golodets (Dynamo Kyiv)
 Viktor Voroshilov (Lokomotiv Moscow)
 Shota Iamanidze (Dinamo Tbilisi)

9 goals
 Valentin Bubukin (Lokomotiv Moscow)
 Yuri Falin (Torpedo Moscow)
 Alakbar Mammadov (Dynamo Moscow)
 Nikita Simonyan (Spartak Moscow)

References

 Soviet Union - List of final tables (RSSSF)

Soviet Top League seasons
1
Soviet
Soviet